Gerald Robinson (born May 4, 1963) is a former American football defensive end who played in the National Football League from 1986 to 1994 for the Minnesota Vikings, the San Diego Chargers and the Los Angeles Rams. He attended the Auburn University and was the Vikings first round draft pick in 1986. He is the all-time sack leader at Auburn University. He now lives in the state of Georgia.

References

1963 births
Living people
Sportspeople from Tuskegee, Alabama
Players of American football from Alabama
American football defensive ends
Auburn Tigers football players
Minnesota Vikings players
San Diego Chargers players
Los Angeles Rams players